The Columbia Football Association was intercollegiate athletic football-only conference affiliated with the National Association of Intercollegiate Athletics (NAIA).  It was composed principally of member schools from the states of Oregon and Washington. From 1988 to 1995, the conference was divided into two separate, geographic divisions, the northern Mount Rainier League (a reference to Mount Rainier in Washington) and the southern Mount Hood League (a reference to Mount Hood in Oregon). After 1995, the conference consolidated into a single division. Former members are currently scattered between NCAA Division II, and NCAA Division III, and the NAIA.

Champions

Division format (1988–1995)

Mount Rainier League
1988 – Central Washington
1989 – Central Washington
1990 – Central Washington
1991 – Central Washington
1992 – Pacific Lutheran
1993 – Pacific Lutheran
1994 – Pacific Lutheran
1995 – Western Washington

Mount Hood League
1988 – Oregon Tech
1989 – Lewis & Clark
1990 – Southern Oregon
1991 – Lewis & Clark and Linfield
1992 – Linfield
1993 – Linfield
1994 – Linfield
1995 –  and

Single Division (1996–2000)

1996 – Western Washington
1997 – Central Washington and Western Oregon
1998 – Central Washington
1999 – Western Washington
2000 – Central Washington and Western Washington

Standings

See also
 List of defunct college football conferences
 Pacific West Conference, NCAA Division II conference that Columbia Football Association members subsequently joined
 Great Northwest Athletic Conference, NCAA Division II conference with teams in the Pacific Northwest

References

 
College sports in Oregon
College sports in Washington (state)